FK Grafičar may refer to:

 FK Grafičar Beograd, Serbian football club based in Belgrade
 FK Grafičar Podgorica, Montenegrin football club based in Podgorica